The 1904 New York Giants season was the 22nd season in franchise history. They led the National League in both runs scored and fewest runs allowed, on their way to 106 wins and the pennant.

The first modern World Series had been played the previous year, but manager John McGraw and owner John T. Brush refused to play the American League champion Boston Americans in a 1904 World Series. They would change their position the following year.

Regular season 

The Giants had little offensive firepower in this pitching-dominated era but scored using a balanced lineup and a lot of small-ball tactics formerly employed by manager McGraw in his playing days. The lineup featured three of the top five stolen base leaders in the majors: Bill Dahlen, Sam Mertes, and Dan McGann.

They also had one of the greatest pitching duos of all-time in Joe McGinnity and Christy Mathewson, who each had arguably the greatest seasons in their Hall of Fame careers. They combined for 68 wins – a 20th-century record for two pitchers on the same team.

Season standings

Record vs. opponents

Notable transactions 
 August 7, 1904: Doc Marshall was purchased from the Giants by the Boston Beaneaters.

Roster

Player stats

Batting

Starters by position 
Note: Pos = Position; G = Games played; AB = At bats; H = Hits; Avg. = Batting average; HR = Home runs; RBI = Runs batted in

Other batters 
Note: G = Games played; AB = At bats; H = Hits; Avg. = Batting average; HR = Home runs; RBI = Runs batted in

Pitching

Starting pitchers 
Note: G = Games pitched; IP = Innings pitched; W = Wins; L = Losses; ERA = Earned run average; SO = Strikeouts

Other pitchers 
Note: G = Games pitched; IP = Innings pitched; W = Wins; L = Losses; ERA = Earned run average; SO = Strikeouts

Relief pitchers 
Note: G = Games pitched; W = Wins; L = Losses; SV = Saves; ERA = Earned run average; SO = Strikeouts

Awards and honors

League top five finishers 
George Browne
 NL leader in runs scored (99)

Bill Dahlen
 NL leader in RBI (80)
 #2 in NL in stolen bases (47)

Christy Mathewson
 NL leader in strikeouts (212)
 #2 in NL in wins (33)

Iron Man McGinnity
 NL leader in wins (35)
 NL leader in ERA (1.61)
 NL leader in shutouts (9)

Sam Mertes
 #2 in NL in RBI (78)
 #2 in NL in stolen bases (47)

References

External links
1904 New York Giants season at Baseball Reference

New York Giants (NL)
San Francisco Giants seasons
New York Giants season
National League champion seasons
New York G
1900s in Manhattan
Washington Heights, Manhattan